This is a list of military rations organized by country and region. A majority of the military rations listed here are present-issue field rations.

Americas

Argentina 
The Armed Forces of the Argentine Republic's Ración de Combate (Individual) was introduced in 2003, consisting of a gray plastic-foil laminate pouch containing a mix of canned and dehydrated foods, plus minimal supplements, for one soldier for one day.  All products in the RC are domestically produced, commercially available items.  Each ration contains: canned meat, small can of meat spread, crackers, instant soup, cereal bar with fruit, a chocolate bar with nuts or caramels, instant coffee, orange juice powder, sugar, salt, a heating kit with disposable stove and alcohol-based fuel tablets, disposable butane lighter, resealable plastic bag, cooked rice, and a pack of paper tissues.

Menu #1 contains: corned beef, meat pâté, crisp water crackers, and instant soup with fideo pasta.

Menu #2 contains: roasted beef in gravy, meat pâté, whole wheat crackers, and quick-cooking polenta in cheese sauce.

Brazil 
The Ração Operacional de Combate – R2 is the current field & combat ration for the Brazilian Army. It is based on the earlier, but similar, Ração Alternativa de Combate, 24 horas developed by the Brazilian Navy for use by Naval Infantry units. It contains the food and supplemental items needed by 1 soldier for 24 hours. It is to be used in situations where no other type of ration is available. All foods are packed inside 4-ply plastic and aluminum polylaminate retort pouches and are ready to eat without further preparation.

The ration is packed inside a heavy-duty (.25 mm thick) matte green or olive drab polyethylene bag measuring 300 mm wide by 400 mm long. It is printed with the logo of the Brazilian Army, the name of the ration, and menu information. Inside are 5 thinner (.10 mm) semi-transparent plastic bags, one for each meal and one for the accessories. Each bag is printed with meal information and contents.

Bag #1: Desjejum (Breakfast, 130 mm x 200 mm)*

Bag #2: Almoço (Lunch, 240 mm x 300 mm)

Bag #3: Jantar (Dinner, 240 mm x 300 mm)

Bag #4: Ceia (Supper, 130 mm x 200 mm)

Bag #5: Acessórios (Accessories, 160 mm x 260 mm)

*also called "Café da Manhã" - e.g. "Morning Coffee",

Each breakfast consists of: 40 g instant coffee w/milk & sugar; 25 g cereal bar, 2 slices of toast (15 g total), and 15 g tub of jelly.

Each lunch consists of: 250 g retort pouched main meal, 150 g pouch of precooked rice, 40 g pouch of cassava pudding, 10 g instant coffee, 2 x 6 g packets of refined sugar, a 25 g bar of pressed raw brown sugar or banana or fruit-flavored sugar, and 45 g of fruit juice powder.

Each dinner consists of: 250 g retort pouched main meal, 100 g can or pouch of precooked sausages, 10 g instant coffee, 2 x 6 g packets refined sugar, 50 g jelly beans or hard candy, 45 g of fruit drink powder.

Each supper consists of: 40 g of chocolate milk powder, 25 g cereal bar, 2 slices of toast (15 g total), and 15 g tub of jelly.

The accessory packet contains: disposable ration heater (round, with air holes in side), 120 g can of alcohol-based fuel (or plastic can with about 6 solid alcohol fuel tablets), 1 box or folder of moisture-resistant matches (20 total), a strip of 5 water purification tablets, 55 g envelope of electrolyte replacement beverage powder, and 6 sheets of multipurpose paper.

The 250 g main meal pouches differ by menu, two provided for each menu (lunch & dinner) as follows:

Menu #1: shredded beef in gravy, spaghetti w/meat sauce

Menu #2: chicken w/vegetables, rice w/black beans & beef

Menu #3: black bean stew, ground beef w/potatoes

Menu #4: dried beef w/pumpkin, chicken w/mixed vegetables & pasta

Menu #5: white beans w/sausage, risotto w/meat & vegetables

Brazil also fields the Ração Operacional de Emergência – R3. This is a 12-hour ration to be used in situations where cooked foods cannot be provided for all meals.

The ration is similar to the R2 and uses the same components, but contains less food. The bag is printed with the emblem of the Brazilian Army, "Ração de Emergência R3 (12 Horas)" and Menu information. Inside are 3 thin plastic bags: 2 meal bags and 1 accessory packet.

Canada 

The Canadian Armed Forces provides each soldier with a complete pre-cooked meal known as the Individual Meal Pack (IMP), packaged inside a heavy-duty folding paper bag. There are 5 breakfast menus, 6 lunch menus, and 6 supper menus. Canadian rations provide generous portions and contain a large number of commercially available items. The main meal is precooked and ready-to-eat, packed in heavy-duty plastic-foil retort pouches boxed with cardboard. Typically, the ration contains a meal item (beans and wiener sausages, scalloped potatoes with ham, smoked salmon fillet, macaroni and cheese, cheese omelette with mushrooms, shepherd's pie, etc.), wet-packed (sliced or mashed) fruit in a boxed retort pouch, and depending on the meal a combination of instant soup or cereal, fruit drink crystals, jam or cheese spread, peanut butter, honey, crackers, bread (bun) compressed into a retort pouch, coffee and tea, sugar, commercially available chocolate bars and hard candy, a long plastic spoon, paper towels and wet wipes. Canada also makes limited use of a Light Meal Pack containing dried meat or cheese, dried fruit, a granola bar, a breakfast cereal square, a chocolate bar, hard candy, hot cocoa mix, tea, and two pouches of instant fruit drink. Canadian ration packs also contain a book of cardboard matches.

Colombia 
The Military Forces of Colombia issues the Ración de Campaña, a dark olive green plastic bag weighing between 1092 and 1205 grams and providing .  Inside are the retort pouch main courses and supplements needed by a soldier for one day.  The individual meals, which cater to South American tastes, consist of a breakfast, a lunch, and a main meal (Tamal, envueltos, lentils with chorizo, arvejas con carne, garbanzo beans a la madrileña, arroz atollado, ajiaco con pollo, and sudado con papas y carne). The ration also includes bread products, beverage mixes, candy and accessories. All items except the beverage mixes require no further preparation and can be eaten either hot or cold.  The beverage powders must be mixed with hot or cold water before consumption.  Each ration also contains raw sugar, a can of condensed milk, sandwich cookies, sweetened and thickened cream spread, hard candy or caramels, peanuts or trail mix or 25 g of roasted almonds, instant coffee, salt, paper towels, a plastic spoon, 2 water purification tablets, and a multivitamin tablet.

Mexico 
The Secretariat of National Defense issues the "Ración Diaria Individual de Combate" box or "individual soldiers daily combat meal" box. It is packaged in an olive green and black plastic box with the contents printed on the front; the box contains three individual meal packs containing meals providing  which are meant to sustain a soldier for one day. Each individual meal package contains two main retort pouches which are meant to be eaten with each other. The first retort pouch usually contains a meat product (such as beef, pork, sausage, fish, ham, seafood, chicken, tuna, bacon, or other meats which are usually mixed with a flavoring sauce and vegetables) the second retort pouch contains a staple food (rice, hominy, noodles, beans, pasta, eggs, or more vegetables). Each meal package also contains salt, spices, condensed milk, cream, butter, chorizo spread, dried fruit or preserves, bread, crackers, sugar, custard, cookies, canned fish, cocoa mix, nuts, chocolate or other candies, vitamins, a large pouch of drinking water, a pouch of Jumex fruit juice or Coca-Cola, biodegradable napkins and utensils, and water purification tablets. Some meal packages do not contain the two main retort pouches and instead contain a single larger pouch with a finished meal such as tamales or steak and eggs but, these are usually only available when close to a base or when the military is operating in an urban area.

United States 

The United States Armed Forces' Meal, Ready-to-Eat (MRE) is packaged similarly to the Canadian ration. Each sealed plastic bag contains one entire precooked meal, with a number of supplements and accessories. The original 12 menus have been expanded to 24 and now contain a variety of ethnic and special request items as well.  Kosher/Halal and Vegetarian menus are also provided.  Each meal bag contains an  main course (packaged in a four-layer plastic and foil laminate retort pouch), 8 hardtack crackers, some form of spread (cheese, peanut butter, or jelly), a fruit-based beverage powder, some form of dessert (cake, candy, cookies, or fruit), and an accessory packet containing coffee or tea, creamer, sugar, salt, matches, a plastic spoon, and toilet paper.  A chemical heater is packed with every meal.

The First Strike Ration (FSR) is a compact, eat-on-the-move ration to be used for no more than three days during initial periods of highly intense, highly mobile combat assaults. A single FSR (24 hours food) is about 50% of the size and weight of three MREs. An FSR is packed in a single trilaminate bag and contains filled pocket sandwiches, a pouch of tuna or chicken, two packets of ERGO high-energy drink mix, two high-energy First Strike Bars, a Soldier Fuel bar, two packets of beef jerky (BBQ or Teriyaki flavored), fortified applesauce, nut and fruit mix, caffeinated gum, and an accessory pack containing a beverage mix, salt, matches, tissues, plastic spoon, and cleansing moist towelettes. The FSR comes in three menus:

Humanitarian daily rations are American rations supplied to civilians and other non-military personnel in humanitarian crises.

The Unitized Group Ration is an American group ration designed to feed groups of personnel. They are divided into four types and can be fully prepared and heated within less than one hour. While most of them are not intended to be eaten in the field, the Unitized Group Ration – Express type can be prepared and eaten in the field.

Europe

Belgium 
The Belgian Armed Forces issues the French Ration de Combat Individuelle Réchauffable (RCIR) to its troops on deployments and exercises.

Czech Republic 
After joining NATO, the Army of the Czech Republic developed a combat ration known as the Bojová Dávka Potravin (BDP). The BDP comes in two versions, type I and II, each holding two ready-to-eat main courses packed in large foil "cans" (beef roast with rice, pork goulash with potato, spicy risotto, pork with carrots and vegetables, etc.), a small plastic cup of lunch meat spread, cheese spread, hard bread, cookies, jam, instant coffee, tea bags, fruit-flavored multivitamin drink tablets, vitamin C enriched fruit drink powder, a chocolate bar, sugar, salt, chewing gum, wet napkins, paper towels, a plastic bag, and a menu and instruction sheet. A modified version of the BDP known as the KDP (Konzervovaná Dávka Potravin) is also used. This contains the same items as the BDP, but adds an aluminium cup, plastic utensils, a folding stove with fuel tablets and matches, and soap.

Denmark 

Danish Defence developed a modern field ration inspired by Norwegian and American rations. It consist of Drytech freeze-dried main meals and several additional items such as dried fruits and nuts, energy bars, hard biscuits, meat pâté, etc.

Finland 
During peacetime, when Finnish Defence Forces conscripts are not provided with meals cooked either in garrisons or attached field kitchens, they are provided with rations (colloquially known as sissi rations) packed in a clear plastic bag. Several different menus exist, however all include foil-packed crispbread, coffee and tea, sugar, chocolate, small tins of beef or pork, chewing gum, dry porridge, energy drink powder, etc. Soups and porridges that are meant to be mixed with water and cooked are usually prepared in Trangia-type portable stoves that are shared by the pair in a fire and maneuver team, or in individual mess kits.

France 

The French Armed Forces 24-hour combat ration, the Ration de Combat Individuelle Réchauffable (RCIR) comes in 14 menus packed in a small cardboard box. Inside are two pre-cooked, ready-to-eat meal main courses packed in thin metal cans somewhat like oversized sardine tins, and an hors d'oeuvre in a more conventional can or tin.  Current main courses include items such as beef salad, tuna and potatoes, salmon with rice and vegetables, shepherd's pie, rabbit casserole, chili con carne, paella, veau marengo (veal), navarin d'agneau (lamb), poultry and spring vegetables, etc. Hors d'oeuvres include: salmon terrine, chicken liver, tuna in sauce, fish terrine, duck mousse, etc. Each meal box also contains a package of instant soup, hard crackers, cheese spread, chocolate, caramels or boiled sweets, instant café-au-lait, sugar, cocoa powder, matches, a disposable folding ration heater and fuel tablets, and water purifying tablets.

Germany 

The Bundeswehr uses the Einmannpackung to provide two substantial meals to each soldier. Practice is to provide one hot cooked meal for the other meal whenever possible. A heater or oven is not included since an Esbit cooker is part of each soldier's personal equipment. Enough food items are contained within the Einmannpackung to sustain the soldier for 24 hours. Currently there are three menus; each includes two meals out of a selection of 19 meals, with several heavy-duty foil trays containing items such as lentils with sausages, Yugoslav Sausage, Goulash, beef patties in tomato sauce, Italian pasta, or Tofu stir-fry.  There are also three smaller foil "cans" of bread spreads such as cheese spread, liver-sausage, dried-meat sausage, or cheese spread with green peppers. The meal box also includes: thinly sliced rye bread (170 g), hard crackers (1100 kcal), a foil can of fruit salad, instant cream of wheat, instant fruit juice powder, instant coffee, instant tea, powdered cream, a chocolate bar, sugar, salt, gum, jam, water purifying tablets, two plastic bags, matches, paper towels, and a user guide.

The Einmannpackung ration is supplied in two types, rations 1 to 5 are packaged in a grey cardboard box with the meals packaged in sealed heavy duty foil trays which may be heated by immersing in hot water. The trays are opened using a knife or other sharp implement. Rations 6 to 19 are packaged in a resealable carry pouch, which is NATO Olive, desert brown or transparent. The meals are packed in retort pouches.

Individual EPa Rations I-V 

Rations 6 to 19 are packaged in a resealable carry pouch, which is NATO Olive, desert brown or transparent. The meals are packed in retort pouches.

Day Rations XV-XIX 
Like other German rations, is packed in a resealable carry pouch with the meals in retort pouches.

Earlier German rations 
In the field, the Wehrmacht were provided rations from field kitchens based on the garrison ration. However additional classes of ration were available. The march ration was a cold food ration issued for not more than three or four consecutive days to units in transit either on carrier or by foot. It consisted of approximately 700 grams of bread, 200 grams of cold meat or cheese, 60 grams of bread spreads, 9 grams of coffee (or 4 grams of tea), 10 grams of sugar, and six cigarettes. Thus it had a total weight of about 980 grams. An iron ration consisted of 250 grams of biscuits, 200 grams of cold meat, 150 of preserved vegetables, 25 of coffee, and 25 of salt. Total weight was 650 grams without packing and 825 grams with packing. An iron half-ration was composed of 250 grams of biscuits and 200 grams of preserved meat; thus its total weight was 450 grams without packing and 535 grams with packing.

Greece 

Most items are commercially procured, with the main meals in round pull-ring cans. Typical contents include: a 200 g canned meat ("SPAM"); 280 g can of meat with vegetables (beef and potatoes, etc.) (termed Prepared Food With Meat or ΠΦΜΚ); a 280 g can of cooked vegetables (green peas, etc.) (Prepared Food Without Meat or ΠΦΑΚ); an 85 g can of cheese; 6 hard biscuits; 40 g honey; three 50 g packages of raisins or chocolate; 30 g sugar; 1.5 g black tea, 2 g instant coffee; 19 g instant milk powder; two small packets of salt; a multivitamin tablet; 4 water purification tablets; a pack of tissues; a disposable ration heater with 5 fuel tablets; and a box of matches. In wartime, packs of locally commandeered cigarettes may also be issued.

Ireland 
The Irish Defence Forces fields a 24-hour ration pack somewhat similar to that used by the British. It is packed in a large ziplock plastic bag and contains two pre-cooked main meals and items to be eaten throughout the day. Included are: instant soup, ramen noodles, an oatmeal block, a high-energy protein bar, both brown and fruit biscuits, sweets, and a selection of beverage mixes. Breakfast (bacon and beans or sausage and beans) is packaged in a retort pouch while dinner (Beef Casserole, Irish Stew, Chicken Curry, or a vegetarian main course) comes in either a flat tin or microwaveable plastic tray. Desserts consist of a retort-pouched dessert (chocolate pudding, syrup pudding, fruit dumplings), a Kendal mint cake, and a roll of fruit lozenges. Beverages include tea bags, instant coffee, hot cocoa, and a powdered isotonic drink mix.  Also included are a pack of tissues, a small scouring pad, matches, water purification tablets, salt and pepper packets, sugar, dry cream powder, moist towelettes, and individual packets of foot powder.

Italy 
The Italian Armed Forces use the "Razione Viveri Speciali da Combattimento", consisting of a heavy duty brownish-green plastic bag with three thin white cardboard cartons inside (one for breakfast, one for lunch and one for dinner), each containing meal items plus accessories. There are seven menus, called "modules", identified by colors: yellow, red, grey, green, white, pink and blue.

Typically, breakfast consists of: a chocolate bar, fruit candy, crackers or sweet bread, instant coffee, sugar, and a tube of sweetened condensed milk. Lunch has: two pull-ring cans with precooked foods (Tortellini al Ragù, Pasta e Fagioli, Wurstel, Tacchino in Gelatina, Insalata di Riso, etc.), a small can of fruit cocktail, a multivitamin tablet, energy and fiber tablets, instant coffee, sugar, and a plastic spoon wrapped with a napkin. Dinner consists of two more meal cans plus crackers, an energy bar, instant coffee, and sugar.

Accessories are: a folding stove, fuel tablets, water purification tablets, toothpick, matches, and three small disposable toothbrushes with pre-applied tooth powder.

Lithuania 
Lithuanian Armed Forces field rations are based on the American MRE. They come in 10 menus packed in a dark green plastic bag, and besides the main meal in a retort pouch they also include two small dark chocolate bars, honey or jam, four hard-tack biscuits, a handful of almonds or hazelnuts, instant drink mix, tea or coffee, sugar, an antiseptic wipe, matches, solid fuel tablets, a flat disposable stove, a flameless heater (similar to the US one) and a cable-tie used to seal waste packaging back into the outer bag after use.

Netherlands 
The Netherlands Armed Forces version of the 24-hour ration, the "Gevechtsrantsoen," (Combat ration) includes canned or retort pouched items, plus hard biscuits, jam, cheese spread, 3 cans of meat spread and 1 can of tuna spread, a chocolate bar, a roll of mints, instant coffee, tea, hot chocolate, lemon-flavour energy drink powder, instant soup, a vitamin pill, and supplementary items.  The canned main course is packed in a thin aluminium can rather like a large sardine tin, containing 400 g of a precooked item such as rice with vegetables and beef, chicken with rice and curry, potatoes with sausage and green vegetables, or sauerkraut with sausage and green vegetables.  The newer retort-pouches contain a 350 g serving of dishes such as brown beans with pork, chili con carne, corned beef hash, or chicken and pasta in tomato sauce. The ration pack provides breakfast and lunch only; the two canned or pouched main meals are issued separately.

Norway 
The Norwegian Armed Forces use a 24-hour ration pack (Norwegian "feltrasjon") designed by Drytech, consisting of 2 freeze-dried main meals, a packet of compressed breakfast cereal, packets of instant soup, and supplements.  These are packed in 3 green polylaminate bags labelled "Breakfast", "Lunch", or "Dinner", overwrapped in clear plastic and issued as one day's ration. Depending on the soldiers activity, the rations are delivered in two different sizes of either 3800 kcal or 5000 kcal. Included are a substantial assortment of beverages (cocoa mix, instant coffee, energy drink powder, and herbal teas), plus thin sliced rye bread and chocolate, chewing gum, a vitamin tablet, and litter bags. There are 7 completely different menus, and ongoing development to meet different nations requirements. The main meals are for example Chili con carne, different pasta dishes, Beef Stew, Beef and Potato Casserole, Lamb Mulligatawny, Cod and Potato Casserole, Pasta Bolognese, Wolf-fish with Prawns and Dill, Sweet and Sour Chicken, Rice in Basil Sauce etc.  Small tins of fish are often provided separately.

Poland 
The current Polish Armed Forces combat ration (Zestaw Żywnościowy Indywidualnej Racji Suchej) is packed in a green plastic-foil bag containing: 2 small cans of meat or meat spread or cheese, 2 packages of hard crackers, a tube of sweetened condensed milk, 2 packets of instant coffee, a packet of instant tea, 3 sugar packets, an individually wrapped Vitamin C fortified boiled sweets, a stick of chewing gum, safety matches, a menu and instruction sheet, a plastic bag, and 2 paper towels.

Field ration (24h) "RB1" / "RB2" / "RB3"

Meal A (breakfast): - goulash 400 g / beans with sausage and meat in tomato sauce 400 g / pork shoulder with rice and vegetables 400 g - pâté 100 g - jam 25 g - crispbread 50 g - instant tea 30 g - fruit bar - flameless heater - sachet water 45 ml

Meal B (lunch): - chicken with rice and vegetables 400 g / spaghetti with meat 400 g / bogracz (Hungarian dish densely with beef ) 400 g - crackers 45 g - instant tea 30 g - condensed milk tube 100 g - dark chocolate 50 g - flameless heater - sachet water 45 ml

Meal C (dinner): - canned meat 100 g - crackers 45 g - honey 25 g - instant tea 30 g - fruit bar

Accessories: - sugar 10 g x3 - coffee candy x3 - vitamin C candy x3 - chewing gum x3 - salt, pepper x3 - dried fruits 50 g - instant tea - instant borsch - plastic bag - matches - toilet paper - wet wipe tissue x3 - cutlery

Energy value 3496,15kcal / 3693,82 kcal / 3459,6 kcal Weight

Russia 

Since the turn of the millennium, the Russian Armed Forces have issues the Individual Food Rations (Individual'nyi Ratsion Pitaniya (IRP) (Индивидуальный рацион питания/ИРП), a new self-contained ration, containing the whole daily food intake for an individual soldier in the field. However, in its most frequent form it is not dietary complete, and is intended only as a stop-gap measure to be issued until the normal supply lines (with their field kitchens) are established and the hot food delivery started, to be issued for no more than six days straight. The Ministry of Defence does not strictly prescribe the contents of the ration, only some basic packaging and inventory requirements, so every producer issues their own version.

Most commonly it is packaged into a sturdy plastic blister box (nicknamed "The Frog" in the field for its olive-green color), or plastic-sealed cardboard box that contains five to six entrees in laminated foil cans or retort pouches, four to six pack of crackers or preserved bread, two to three dessert items in form of a spread or fruit bar, four beverage concentrate pouches, some seasonings (salt, pepper, sugar, ketchup), and various sundry items like sanitizing wipes/paper towels, spoons, can opener, four hexamine fuel tablets, folding heater, matches and water purifier tablets. The types of entrees vary with the producer and the issued menu (of which there are usually 7 to 12), but the common set is based on a traditional Russian outdoorsmen fare, is largely formed out of the commercially available canned food, and usually includes 1 portion of stewed beef or pork, two meat-with-vegetables dishes, like various porridges, stews or canned fish, and one or two spreads, such as liver pâté, sausage stuffing or processed cheese. Desserts may include fruit jams, chocolate and/or walnut spreads, chocolate bars, sweetened condensed milk, etc., but baked goods are usually avoided out of concerns about their shelf life. Other variants may add canned speck and/or dried fish or exchange the hexamine tablets for the flameless heater.

Spain 

The Spanish Armed Forces issues an individual meal pack, available in 5 different menus, comprising a small cardboard box overwrapped with drab green polyethylene. Inside are 3 canned meals, plus accessories. Typical contents (Menu B) include: stewed steak, pickled mackerel, liver pâté with red peppers, an envelope of instant soup, a can of fruit, 2 salt tablets, 2 water purification tablets, a large multivitamin tablet, 10 sheets of general purpose paper, a book of matches, a folding can opener, a small folding ration heater and 2 fuel tablets, and an instruction sheet in three languages (Spanish, English and French). Crackers or bread are issued separately.

Sweden 
The Swedish Armed Forces use ration packs from the Swedish-developed 24 hour meals. 24 hour meals have a long range of menus (approx. 200) and can deliver both freezedried and wet meals. The Swedish concept (combat edition) consists of several versions for different use, in all climate zones, and various types of missions. Examples of different types of rations: 1-course (patrolration), 2-course, 3-course and 4-course versions with a variation of 40 different meals, both wet and dry. The rations varies from 1300 kcal to 5000 kcal. The ration is packed in a transparent durable plastic bag that is resealable with a ziplock. The contents are 1–4 main meals with energy bars, protein bars, nuts, energy drinks, whole wheat bread, peanut butter, desserts and spices for example. The durable bag change size depending on the version for optimal space usage in cartons and soldiers' backpacks. 24 hour meals have been developed at a rapid pace and are currently producing their 5th generation (first in 2008). R&D are working close with soldiers in Scandinavia and various missions around the world.

United Kingdom

12 Hour Operational Ration Pack 
The British Armed Forces' 12 hour operational ration pack (ORP) is designed for patrolling for durations of 4–12 hours and for is suitable for remote guard posts, drivers and as a supplement to normal rations for where daily calorie expenditure is likely to exceed 6000 kcal (25,120 kJ), for instance, troops undergoing arduous duties.

The 12 hour ORP contains a main meal packed in a retort pouch, a number of snack items, drink powders and a flameless ration heater (FRH). However it does not contain any hot beverage items.

There are 10 menu choices including one vegetarian.

The 12 hour ORP provides a minimum of 2000 kcals (8,374 kJ).

24 Hour Operational Ration Pack 

The UK provides the Operational Ration Pack, General Purpose.  Packed inside a small cardboard box, each ration has enough retort-pouched and canned foods to feed one soldier for 24 hours.  Seven menus (plus vegetarian and religious variants) provide two precooked meals (Breakfast and Main Meal) plus a midday snack. Example (Menu A) Breakfast: Hamburger and beans, Instant Porridge.  All ration packs also contain Oatmeal Block, Fruit Biscuits, Biscuits Brown (a more compact alternative to bread), a sachet of instant soup and jam or yeast extract (a Marmite like spread) for a lunchtime snack, and chocolate (in the form of a specially made Yorkie bar which is flatter than civilian bars, or, more recently, a simple unbranded bar of milk chocolate), though this has been phased out with the introduction of the more recent multi-climate ration packs, and boiled sweets (hard candy) for snacking whilst on patrol, or in free time.  Main Meal: Instant soup, Chicken with Mushroom and Pasta, Treacle Pudding.  Each pack also contains instant coffee, tea bags, creamer, sugar, hot cocoa mix, beef/vegetable stock powder, lemon/orange powder or Lucozade electrolyte powder, matches, packet of tissues, chewing-gum, a small bottle of Tabasco sauce, and water purifying tablets. They sometimes also contain chicken and herb pâté. Also available are Kosher/Halal, Vegetarian, and Hindu/Sikh specific menus. Regardless of their contents, these ration packs are referred to as Rat-Packs or Compo (short for Composite Rations) by the soldiers who eat them.  In addition to containing the 24-hour ration, the outside of the cardboard box has a range card printed on its side for use by the soldier to record key features and their range from their position. Other variations designed for specific environments exist.

The rations are issued with a new folding cooker and fire-lighting fuel called FireDragon made in Wales by BCB International Ltd.

24 Hour Multi Climate Ration Box A

24 Hour Multi Climate Ration Box B

24 Hour Multi Climate Ration Sikh/Hindu

24 Hour Multi Climate Ration Halal/Kosher

24 Hour Multi Climate Ration Vegetarian

24 Hour Jungle Ration 
The 24 Hour Jungle ration is based on the standard 24 Hour ration with additional supplements and a Flameless Ration Heater (FRH). The Jungle ration is designed for use by the special forces and other specialist units.

The 24 Hour Jungle Ration provides a minimum of 4500 kcals (18,840 kJ) a day.

Cold Climate Ration 
The Cold Climate Ration (CCR) is a specialist and lightweight, high calorie 24 hour ration designed for use by troops above the snow line or in the high Arctic. It comprises mainly dehydrated main meals with a range of snacks designed to be eaten on the go.

There are 8 menu choices available.

The cold climate ration provides a minimum of 5500 kcals (23,030 kJ) a day.

10 Man Operational Ration Pack 
The UK also fields a larger pack of rations intended to feed ten soldiers for 24 hours from centralised but basic preparation; generally similar in content to the single issue ORP but tending to contain larger quantities of food in cylindrical tin cans to be divided up on preparation, rather than individual retort pouches or packets.  Even dry materials like sugar or biscuits are often packed in these cans. They contain ingredients for baking bread and tinned food, including vegetables, corned beef and sausages in lard. Also included are chocolate, pre-cooked chicken or beef in gravy and soya mince. Ten boxed one-man ORPs are supplied in larger boxes identical in shape to the single ten-man pack.

10 Man Operational Ration Pack Menus A-E

Emergency Flying Rations (EFR) Mark 4 
The Mark 4 EFR is designed for crews of fast jets. It consists of a flat tin it contains 100 g of fruit flavoured sweets, (9 to be eaten each day) 2 spring handles and a plastic bag. The container can be used for boiling water and hot drinks can be made by dissolving the sweets in hot water. The Mark 4 EFR is built into ejector seats.

Emergency Flying Rations (EFR) Mark 9 
The Mark 9 EFR is designed for crews of multi-engine aircraft. It consists of a two piece aluminium container, four wire spring handles, two emergency food packs (eight portions per pack), one packet of beef stock drinking cubes (six cubes per pack), two packets of sugar cubes (twelve cubes per pack), one beverage pack (containing seven sachets of instant coffee, four sachets of instant tea and seven sachets of vegetable creamer), two spatulas, one polythene bag and an instruction leaflet.

Costs of rations 
The cost of a 10-man ration pack is £55.00. The cost of a 24-hour operational ration pack is £10.00

Earlier British rations

1940s 
In 1943, the 24 Hour Ration was devised as a direct replacement to the 48 Hour Mess tin ration. It contained only dried goods (no tins), to save weight and tinplate, which was the criticism of the earlier mess tin ration. It was first issued to troops on D-Day to provide interim food prior to supply lines being established which would permit 14 Man Composition Rations being brought ashore.

There were two packs (contents identical), the standard 24 Hour Ration and the 24 Hour Ration (Assault), the former fitting into the larger portion of the mess tin and the latter fitting into the smaller portion. The pack provided approximately 4000 calories. The contents of the ration pack were as follows, most of which were wrapped in either cellophane or in white, heat-sealed wax paper with royal blue writing:1 block of dried meat (beef or lamb), 2 sweetened oatmeal blocks, tea, milk and sugar cubes, 10 biscuits (plain, service), 2 bars of raisin chocolate, 1 bar of vitamin enriched chocolate (vit. A, B, C, D and calcium),  of boiled sweets, 2 packets of peppermint chewing gum, 4 meat extract cubes, 4 cubes of sugar, salt, 4 sheets of latrine paper.

1970s 
The 24 hour GS (General Service) ration pack was supplied with the contents in cans or packets.

*Biscuits AB stands for "Biscuits-Alternative Bread", these were called more colourful names by members of the British Army due to the fact they caused constipation.

1980s 
The 24 hour GS (General Service) ration pack was supplied with the contents in cans or packets.

Arctic Rations 
Arctic rations were dehydrated and issued to troops serving in arctic areas where snow could be melted to rehydrate the dehydrated contents.

1990s 
In the 1990s cans were replaced with retort pouches and menu options improved and expanded. The ration was redesignated as the 24 Hour General Purpose (GP) Ration Pack.

Ukraine 
The Armed Forces of Ukraine's combat ration was based on a previous Russian version, consisting of commercially available cans and dried foods packed together in a sectioned box (resembles a takeout tray) made of very thin green plastic. Inside were: two 250 g mmin meal cans (boiled buckwheat groats and buckwheat w/beef); two 100 g cans of meat spread (liver pâté and beef in lard); a 160 g can of herring or mackerel; six 50 g packages small, hard crackers (resemble oyster crackers); two foil pouches (20 g each) of jam or jelly; six boiled sweets two tea bags; an envelope of instant cherry juice powder; a chicken flavour bouillon cube; two packets of sugar; and three dining packets, each with a plastic spoon, a napkin, and a moist towelette.

In 2018, the Ukrainian military improved their ration contents to be more inline with NATO standards, with different menus for each day in a week. By the Russian invasion of Ukraine, according to a BBC News correspondent who received a field ration from a Ukrainian soldier, the contents of a typical Ukrainian field rations included "wheat porridge with beef; rice and meat soup; beef stew; chicken with vegetables; pork and vegetables; crackers; biscuits; tea bags; coffee; blackcurrant drink; honey; sugar; black pepper; chewing gum; bar of dark chocolate; plastic spoons; [and] moist wipes".

Portugal 
The Portuguese Armed Forces developed and fields the Ração Individual de Combate (RIC). Maximum use is made of off-the-shelf commercial items, including canned main menu items (still with their original labels). A typical RIC (menu 4) contains: two 415 g "poptop" cans (beef w/vegetables and chili con carne), a flat 115 g can of sardines, round 65 g can of liver paste, sweet bread, crackers, packaged bread, 2 pouches of fruit jam, pouch of quince cream, hot chocolate or instant coffee, isotonic drink mix, instant milk powder, chewing gum, boiled sweets, sugar, salt, water purification tablets, matches, 6 fuel tablets, a folding stove, plastic cutlery, a pack of tissues, a plastic bag, and an instruction/menu sheet.

Middle East

Israel 

The Israel Defense Forces "battle ration" (Manat Krav) is designed to be shared by four soldiers. It contains 1 can of rice filled vine leaves, 8 small cans of tuna, canned olives, a can of sweet corn, a can of pickled cucumbers, 1 can of halva spread and 1 chocolate spread, a can of peanuts, fruit flavored drink powder, and bread or matzoh crackers. There is also an "ambush pack" of candy and high-energy protein bars.

In 2008, Israel introduced a new field ration to supplement the traditional Manat Krav.  Unlike previous rations, the new Battle Ration consists of individual, self-heating, ready-to-eat meals packed inside plastic-aluminum trays.  They are designed to be carried and used by infantry troops for up to 24 hours, until regular supply lines can be established.  Ten menus are available, including chicken, turkey and kebab; each meal pack is supplemented with dry salami, dried fruit, tuna, halva, sweet roll, and preserved dinner rolls. However, as of 2012, the older rations were still in use.

In 2011, as a result of the manufacturer going bankrupt, the IDF phased out the can of corned beef (known as 'Loof'), which had been part of the battle ration since the nation's founding. It would be replaced by "ground meat with tomato sauce".

Many different recipes and different ways of serving the rations have developed in Israel. With the can of tuna, for example, traditionally cooked using toilet paper soaked in oil.

Saudi Arabia 
The Armed Forces of Saudi Arabia uses a combat meal that is packed inside a brown plastic bag about the size and shape of an American MRE pouch.  It contains a small can of tuna, a small can of sardines or salmon or beef, a small can of cheese or thickened cream, an envelope of instant noodle soup, hard crackers and dry toast (like Zwieback), a small bag of raisins or dried fruit, a small package of dates, a small bag of nuts, plus instant coffee, tea bags, sugar packets, matches, and a bag of spiced dried chickpea powder.

United Arab Emirates 
The United Arab Emirates Armed Forces uses  a European-style combat ration pack containing food and accessories for one soldier for 24 hours.  Packed in the UAE using imported components, the ration box measures 245 mm × 195 mm × 115 mm and weighs 2.0 kg. Inside are 4 resealable (ziplock type) plastic bags, labeled in both Arabic & English, containing Breakfast, Lunch, Dinner, and Miscellaneous.

A typical Breakfast bag has 2 foil-wrapped packages of hard brown biscuits, 1 small jar of apricot jam, a can of tuna, and an accessory pack (plastic spoon, salt, pepper, and napkin).

Lunch contains a retort pouch of precooked rice, a retort pouch of chicken curry, a pouch date pudding, and another accessory pack.

Dinner has a retort pouch of pasta rigatoni, an envelope instant soup, and a third accessory pack.

The Miscellaneous bag contains a small bag of hard candy, 4 packets of sugar, 4 tea bags, 2 small envelopes of milk powder, and 3 foil envelopes of instant orange juice powder.

Also included are: a can of fruit, a package of ramen noodles, 2 flameless chemical ration heaters, a menu/instruction sheet, 1 pack dried hummus powder, and a book of matches.

Oceania

Australia 

The Australian Defence Force currently supplies three different types of military ration packs – Combat Ration One Man, Combat Ration Five Man and Patrol Ration One Man.

Combat Ration One Man is a complete 24-hour ration pack that provides two substantial meals per day and a wide variety of drinks and snacks for the remainder of the day. Most items, such as Beef Kai Si Ming, Dutch-style Beef with Vegetables, Beef with Spaghetti, Baked Beans, Sausages with Vegetables, or Chicken with pasta and vegetables, are packed in 250 gram sized plastic-foil retort pouches. Included with every meal pack is a pouch of instant rice or instant mashed potatoes, a fruit and grain bar, 2 envelopes of instant drink powder, some biscuits, an "Anzac Biscuit", a chocolate bar, M&M's, coffee, tea, sugar, crackers, cheese spread, jam, sweetened condensed milk, hard sweets, and Vegemite. In practical use, these packs are "stripped" by removing and trading with other soldiers, those components that are unlikely to be consumed by the person carrying the pack. This also reduces the weight of the packs, allowing more to be carried. There are eight menu choices, one of which is vegetarian. None of them are allergen free since Defence Force members are typically selected, among many other attributes, for their no known allergy status.

Combat Ration Five Man contains a similar array of components as the Combat Ration One Man. However, it is provided in a tough fibreboard carton rather than in individual unitised polyethylene bags. It is a group feeding solution, and it is impractical to use on an individual basis for main meals. There are a multiple of group-sized retort pouches – 500 gram as opposed to 250 gram, several of which are required to be heated in order to provide a complete meal. Examples include Beef & Blackbean Sauce, Chicken Satay. Common elements include rice and vegetables such as corn, potatoes and carrots. The accessories such as snacks are consumable and can be carried individually.

Patrol Ration One Man is a complete 24-hour ration pack that contains freeze dried main meals, meaning that the total weight of each pack is reduced, however a correspondingly higher quantity of water must be carried in order to reconstitute the main meal. Otherwise, it is similar to the Combat Ration One Man. It is packed in tough clear polyethylene bags and is available in five menu choices.

New Zealand 
The New Zealand Defence Force issues an Operational Ration Pack designed to provide one soldier with three complete meals. Based around two ready-to-eat retort pouches (e.g. Lamb Casserole, Chicken Curry), the ORP comes in 4 menus. Also included are: Anzac biscuits, chocolate bars, URC fruit grains, muesli bars, instant soup powder, instant noodles, muesli cereal, a tube of condensed milk, hard crackers, tinned cheese, cocoa powder, instant coffee, tea bags, instant sport drink powder, sugar, salt, pepper, glucose sweets, Marmite, jam, ketchup, onion flakes, waterproofed matches, a resealable plastic bag, and a menu sheet.

Operational Ration Pack 1 Man-24 Hours 

The Patrol Ration Pac (PRP) is a shelf-stable product that provides an efficient, flexible and nutritionally robust feeding method. The PRP is designed to cover activities when you have access to other food sources during the day and is ideal to replace a single meal or provide snack options. The PRP provides approximately one-third of the energy and nutrient requirements of most military personnel during moderate, prolonged-intensity physical activity, in a temperate environment. Therefore, it is desirable that all of the food in the pack is eaten.

Menus A, B and C contain main meals that can be heated using a flameless ration heater along with other ready to eat foods and a beverage powder. Menu D provides ready to eat snack foods and no beverage powder.

Asia

Brunei 
The Royal Brunei Armed Forces uses a 24-hour ration pack that provides a soldier with an entire day's supply of food, plus a limited number of health and hygiene items.  Maximum use is made of plastic-foil laminate pouches, and most items can be eaten without further preparation. Currently, four menus are fielded, and all menus are compatible with Muslim dietary restrictions. Example Menu (F): 5 x 170-gram retort pouches (Biriani Chicken, Mutton Curry, Sardines in Tomato Sauce, Bubur Jagong/ Corn Porridge, Pineapple Pajeri); plus individual servings of pineapple jam, instant coffee, teabags, sugar, salt, pepper, steminder powder, hot chili sauce, MSG, a multivitamin energy tablet, tissue paper, scouring pad with soap, and matches.

India 
The Indian Armed Forces issues a host of rations including the One Man Combo Pack Ration, Mini Combo Pack, Survival Ration, and Main Battle Tank Rations. The shelf-life of the ration is 12 months.  India has adopted retort processing technology for combat rations.

The rations use pre-cooked thermostabilized entrees in a plastic-foil laminate retort pouch. The ration does not require cooking and the contents may be eaten cold, though warming is preferred. An entire day's worth of food, plus accessory items, is packed inside a heavy-duty olive green plastic bag with pasted on label.  The menu consists of several different Vegetarian and Non-Vegetarian products that cater to Indian tastes, such as sooji halwa, chapaties, tea mix, chicken biryani, chicken curry, Kebab, Tandoori, Panneer, Organic Egg, Butter nun, mutton biryani, Mutton curry, Vegetable biryani, rajma curry, dal fry, jeera rice, Dal makhani, vegetable pulav and mixed vegetable curry, alongside pickled hot seasoning, in small plastic pouches.

The One Man Combo Pack consists of early morning tea, breakfast, mid morning tea, lunch, evening tea, and dinner. The menus feature both dehydrated and ready-to-eat products, and include a folding stove and hexamine fuel tablets. The ration weighs 880 grams and provides . The Mini Combo Pack is a simplified version of the One Man Combo Pack, weighing 400 g and providing .

The Survival Ration consists of a soft bar and chikki. The daily survival ration per man consists of: Soft bar 100 g x 2, Chikki (sugar base) 50 g x 3, Chikki (Jaggery base) 50 g x 3.

The Main Battle Tank Ration is specifically designed for armored vehicle crews. Designed to sustain four soldiers for 72 h in closed-in battle conditions, the MBT ration is based on instant/ready to eat foods and ration/survival bars.

Indonesia 
The Indonesian National Armed Forces (TNI) has introduced the Ransum TNI ("TNI ration", from Dutch rantsoen) in the mid-1970s in order to standardize nutrition for soldiers in field. The main course are usually meat-based meals (fish, beef, chicken, etc.) with cooked rice. The supplementary drinks are instant coffee, powdered fruit juice or vitamin supply, tea bags and powdered milk . The rations should be heated for 10–15 minutes with the included portable stove and solid fuel tablets (for canned meals), or by submerging in boiling water (for meals packed in retort pouches). All products are made in Indonesia and manufactured according to Indonesian military standard.

Japan 

The Japan Self-Defense Forces use two types of combat rations, Type I combat ration (戦闘糧食 I型) and Type II combat ration (戦闘糧食 II型).  The older Type I ration consists almost entirely of canned foods weighing a total of 780 g per meal; a normal three-day ration has up to 36 cans weighing more than 7 kilograms.  Eight menus are available, based around a 400 g can of rice and 2–3 smaller supplemental cans.  Typical contents include: rice (white rice, sekihan, mixed rice with vegetables, or rice with mushrooms), a main meal can (chicken and vegetables, beef with vegetables, fish and vegetables, or hamburger patties), pickled vegetables (takuan or red cabbage) and sometimes a supplemental can (tuna in soy or beef in soy). In the latest type I combat rations, cans have been replaced by retort pouches.

The newer, lighter Type II ration was originally intended to replace the Type I and consists of pre-cooked, ready-to-eat items in plastic-foil laminate retort pouches, packed in turn inside a drab green polyethylene meal bag.  Each meal consists of two 200 g pouches of rice (white rice, rice with red beans, mixed rice with meat and vegetables, fried rice, curried rice pilaf, rice with green peas, or rice with wild herbs) plus 2–3 supplementary pouches.  Main meal pouches contain: hamburger patties, frankfurters, beef curry, grilled chicken, Chinese meatballs, Sweet and Sour pork, grilled salmon, yakitori chicken, mackerel in ginger sauce, chicken and vegetables, and tuna.  Also included are pouches of pickled vegetables (yellow radish, red cabbage, takana pickles, pickled hari-hari, or bamboo shoots) or salad (potato salad or tuna salad) and instant soup (miso, egg drop, wakame seaweed, or mushroom).

Type I Combat Ration (Old) 
The old model type I combat rations were supplied in cans, with one large can containing the rice portion and 2 or 3 smaller cans containing other portions.

Type I Combat Ration (New) 
The new model type I combat ration is supplied in olive drab retort pouches and overwrapped in an olive drab bag.

The acquisition cost to the SDF is 554 yen.

Type II Combat Ration (Old)

Type II Combat Ration (New) 

The acquisition cost to the SDF is 329 yen.

Malaysia 
The Malaysian Armed Forces version of the 24-hour ration pack is intended to provide one man with sufficient food and supplements for one day.  Most items are domestically procured and cater to local tastes and religious dietary requirements. The ration makes extensive use of commercially available canned and dehydrated items.  Wherever possible, plastic-foil pouches are used instead of cans.  The ration is supplemented with precooked or freeze-dried rice.  Example menu C: Beef Kurma, Chicken Masak Merah, Fish Curry, and Sambal Shrimp; Bean Curd and Vegetable mix; long bean stew; canned pineapple and canned papaya; 2 packages of quick-cooking porridge (black bean porridge and flour porridge); military biscuits; jam; instant coffee; tea; instant milk powder; sugar; salt; vitamin tablets; matches; and napkins.

China 

The People's Liberation Army's rations are of two types: Instant Meal Individual (three-item menu) and Self-Heating Individual (twelve-item menu) (Type 13 and 09). Sets of rations issued since 2018 consist of pre-packaged single-person meals sealed in hard plastic retort pouches. Each Self-Heating Individual comes with an insulated flameless heater that is activated by water.

Philippines 
The Armed Forces of the Philippines formerly had a combat ration similar to American MREs. Typically, they included a small can of sardines or tuna, instant noodles, crackers, instant coffee, a small packet of peanuts, ginger tea, and a biscuit or cookie. Chocolate manufactured for hot conditions are sometimes issued. Canned rice is also issued.

In 2016, "Ready-to-Eat" rations were announced to replace older rations. They are packed in green plastic retort pouches and considered fit to eat for Muslim service members (halal). For example, Menu #2 has four packs of cooked rice, one tuna rice with sisig, one pack of chicken sausage with sauce, one pack of chicken lechon paksiw, one pack of powdered milk, one pack of 3-in-1 coffee, one pack of plain crackers, a spork, and wet tissues.

Singapore 
The Singapore Armed Forces issues three types of combat rations – Type M (Muslim), Type N (Non-Muslim), and Type V (Vegetarian). Each type comes in 4 or 5 different menus, packed in a heavy-duty green plastic bag similar to an American MRE bag, but measuring 205 mm x 190 mm x 115 mm (8" x 7.5" x 4.5") and weighing . Most items are retort-pouched (in the form of a watery paste and eaten straight from the pouch) and (except for the hot beverages) can be eaten without further preparation. Each ration bag includes 2 retort-pouched main courses, a dessert, and an accessory pack containing 2 fruit bars, 4 packages of cookies, an envelope of isotonic drink mix powder, an envelope of instant flavored tea mix, a hot beverage (coffee, cocoa, or tea), an envelope of cereal mix, candy, matches, fuel tablets, and tissue paper. A package of instant noodles is provided with every meal pack, but is issued separately. Typical Type M (Menu #1): Rendang Mutton with rice; Tandoori Chicken with rice; Red Bean dessert. Typical Type N (Menu #5): Pasta Bolognese; Yellow Rice with Chicken; Barley Dessert with milk. Typical Type V (Menu #1): Mock Chicken Curry with rice; Vegetarian Fried Noodle; Green Bean dessert with coconut milk.

Sri Lanka 
The primary operational ration of the Sri Lanka Armed Forces is the Jungle Ration, a 24-hour ration pack whose components are produced and assembled in Sri Lanka.  It is issued to soldiers at the rate of one per soldier per day, and contains both food and sun-dry items designed to sustain troops where food storage and preparation facilities are not practical.  All meals are precooked, requiring neither cooking nor preparation, and all items are packaged inside sealed plastic packages or lightweight aluminium cans.  Precooked rice is included as part of every meal.  Typical contents are: chicken curry with potatoes, vegetable curry, precooked rice, hard crackers, processed cheese, soup cubes, instant milk powder, orange drink powder, and dates or dried pineapple. A sundry pack containing tea bags, sugar, salt, glucose tablets, seasonings, matches, plastic bags, and toilet paper is included with every ration pack.

South Korea 

The Republic of Korea Armed Forces issues two types of field rations, Type I and Type II. Type I ration has ready-to-eat foods packed in foil-plastic trilaminate pouches, placed in turn inside a thin cardboard box.  Typical contents include: 1 pouch (250 g) precooked white rice with meat and vegetables, plus a separate seasoning packet; 1 pouch (250 g) precooked rice with red beans; 1 packet (100 g) of 6 pork sausages in BBQ; 1 packet (100 g) kimchi; and 1 packet (50 g) cooked black beans.  The Type II ration is a smaller, lighter, freeze-dried single-meal ration consisting of several small pouches packed inside a larger gray plastic pouch measuring 225 mm x 200 mm x 90 mm and weighing 278 g.  Typical contents include: freeze dried rice (various flavors, usually with meat and vegetables included), a pouch of instant soup, flavored sesame oil, seasoning and spice packets, dried chives and chocolate.

Taiwan 
The Republic of China Armed Forces issues two types of field rations. One of them is called "field combat ration pack" (野戰口糧), which contains crackers, bakkwa, dry mango, nuts, chocolate paste, candy and energy drink. The other one is "field combat retort pouch" (野戰加熱式餐盒), which has 13 types of flavor in total.

Vietnam 
Field rations issued by the People's Army of Vietnam include the Army Field Ration BB107, the Paratrooper Dry Provision (for pilots), and the Chinese 3 star field ration that is contained in an iron box, easy to carry. The word "field ration" in Vietnamese called "lương khô" (Han-Nom: 糧枯). The Ministry of Defense also develops rations for the Special Operations Force and the Border Patrol Force. The new rations are used in three main courses - breakfast, lunch and dinner. They mostly contain Vietnamese braised pork, meat stews, sticky rice, white rice, dried vegetables that can be heated with water, nutrition drinks, fruit juices, nutrition snacks, eateries (spoon, fork and straw), napkins, and toothpicks.

In the Vietnam War, Viet Cong troops often brought dried cooked vegetables, bags of pork floss, contained nutrition tabs, and ginger candy as their ration food.

United Nations 
During peacekeeping operations in Lebanon, United Nations peacekeepers were reported to make use of a ration packaged similar to that of the American MRE designated the Individual Food Ration (French: Ration Alimentaire Individuelle). These rations are meant to be consumed over a period of 24 hours, and are notoriously difficult to acquire by civilians. There are 12 available menus in the form of 3 “Western” (Pasta with Beef and Chickpea Stew, Vegetables with Beef and Tomato and Cheese Pasta, Chilli Con Carne, Baked Beans), 3 Halal, 3 Kosher, and 3 Vegetarian. Each ration also comes with both sweet and salty biscuits and an accessory pack containing fruit muesli, fruit jelly, fruit jam, dark chocolate, cheese spread, chewing gum, eight pouches of sugar, salt, pepper, ketchup and Mexican sauce. Another accessory pack with instant coffee, tea, an instant fruit drink and a hyperprotein drink is also included.

See also 

 Field ration
 Garrison ration
 Mess
 Military rations

References

External links 

 MREInfo

Military food
Military lists
Lists of foods